Jesus' Son may refer to:

 Jesus Son (short story collection), a 1992 collection of short fiction by Denis Johnson
 Jesus Son (film), a 1991 film based on Johnson's book
 "Jesus Son" (song), a 2016 song by Placebo